Shurak (also Romanized as Shūrak and Shūrek) is a village in Babolrud Rural District, in the Central District of Babolsar County, Mazandaran Province, Iran. At the 2006 census, its population was 711, in 188 families.

References 

Populated places in Babolsar County